Cleta is a genus of moth in the family Geometridae.

Species
 Cleta filacearia (Herrich-Schäffer, 1847)
 Cleta jacutica (Viidalepp, 1976)
 Cleta perpusillaria (Eversmann, 1847)
 Cleta ramosaria (Villers, 1789)

References

Sterrhini